The Sheibani Network is an Iraqi smuggling network and Shi'a Insurgent group led by Abu Mustafa al-Sheibani, an ex-commander of the Supreme Council for Islamic Revolution in Iraq's Badr Brigades. The group is said to be used by Iran's Revolutionary Guards' Quds Force to supply Iraqi Special Groups. The group is alleged to be responsible for numerous attacks on Iraqi and Coalition forces. The network is said to consist of 280 members, divided in 17 units. US commanders have estimates that weapons smuggled and used by the group have been responsible for the death of 170 and injury of 600 American soldiers by February 2007. Abu Mustafa al-Sheibani himself is said to have fled to Tehran, Iran to evade capture, where he currently resides.

History 
After the 2003 Invasion of Iraq, ex-Badr commander Abu Mustafa al-Sheibani set up his own logistics, arms, and financing network using his connections with the Badr Organisation, which he also supplied. In January 2005 he was recruited by the Quds Force to supply the Muqtada al-Sadr's Jaish al-Mahdi (JAM) as well as a splinter group led by Qais al-Khazali: the Khazali Network, which would later become Asa'ib Ahl al-Haq (AAH). The Sheibani Network, via old Badr smuggling routes trafficked Explosively formed penetrators (EFPs), Improvised explosive devices (IEDs), 107mm rockets, 122mm rockets, Katyusha rockets, and a variety of mortars into Iraq. They also make bombs themselves. Next to weapons the group also smuggles money, designated for special groups, from Iran to Iraq and transports militiamen from other groups from Iraq to Iran and Lebanon to receive training.

The group itself also took part in insurgent activities, the group is alleged to be involved in the killing of six British Royal Military Policemen in June 2003 by a mob in Majar al-Kabir, Maysan Governorate. They are also said to be responsible for a roadside bombing which killed 3 British soldiers in July 2005 in al-Amarah and an attack in August 2005 against an embassy convoy in Basra which killed 3 British bodyguards. By September 2005 the group was alleged to be responsible for the death of at least 11 British soldiers. The groups fighters are said to have received training from the Quds Force and Lebanese Shi'a militia Hezbollah. They have also been alleged to be responsible for the assassinations of local police chiefs hostile to Shi'a militia and politicians who are against Iranian influence, such as the Police Chief of Najaf, the Deputy-Governor of Najaf Governorate and Muhammad al-Friji, an Iraqi Colonel.

The group's activities were said to be increasing in mid-2010 and were said to be closely cooperating with Asa'ib Ahl al-Haq.

References

External links 

Arab militant groups
Factions in the Iraq War
Iraqi insurgency (2003–2011)
Islam in Iraq
Paramilitary organizations based in Iraq
Shia Islamist groups
Terrorism in Iraq
Axis of Resistance